Łęczyca Voivodeship was a unit of administrative division and local government in Poland from the 14th century until the partitions of Poland in 1772–1795. It was part of Province of Greater Poland, and its capital was in Łęczyca. The voivodeship had the area of 4,080 square kilometers, divided into three counties. Local sejmiks took place at Łęczyca. The city of Łódź, which until the 19th century was a small town, for centuries belonged to Łęczyca Voivodeship.

The voivodeship was created by King Wladyslaw Lokietek, out of the territory of Duchy of Łęczyca, which had been established after the 1138 Testament of Bolesław III Krzywousty. It had five senators in the Senate of the Kingdom of Poland (since 1569 the Polish–Lithuanian Commonwealth). These were: Voivode of Łęczyca, Castellan of Łęczyca, Castellan of Brzeziny, Castellan of Inowlodz, and Castellan of Konary. At the sejmiks, local nobility elected four deputies to the Sejm of Poland, and two deputies to the Greater Poland Tribunal at Piotrków Trybunalski.

Zygmunt Gloger in his monumental book Historical Geography of the Lands of Old Poland gives a detailed description of Łęczyca Voivodeship:

"Following the testament of Boleslaw Krzywousty, the Land of Łęczyca was a separate duchy, ruled by princes of the Piast dynasty (...) King Wladyslaw Lokietek reunited the duchy with Poland, making it a separate voivodeship. Local residents were used to their own legal system, so King Władysław II Jagiełło decided to keep a separate official there. In 1418, the szlachta of Łęczyca established its own rules, the 27 Articles of Constitutiones Terrae Lanciciensis generales (...)

The voivodeship had the area of 80 square miles, stretching from Klodawa in the north, to the Pilica river in the south, where it bordered Sandomierz Voivodeship. In the 16th century, it had 74 Roman-Catholic parishes, 25 towns and 875 villages. It was the second most densely populated voivodeship of the Polish–Lithuanian Commonwealth, behind Brześć Kujawski Voivodeship (...)

Łęczyca Voivodeship had five senators: the Voivode of Łęczyca, the Castellan of Łęczyca, and the Castellans of Brzeziny, Inowlodz, and Konary (...) Of the three counties, the largest one was Łęczyca County, which covered more than half of the area of the voivodeship. Local sejmiks took place at Łęczyca, where four deputies were elected to the Sejm, and additional two to the Greater Poland Tribunal at Piotrków Trybunalski. Main starostas resided at Łęczyca, Inowlodz, Zgierz and Klodawa".

Governor seat: Łęczyca

Voivodes:
 Spycigniew of Dąbrowa Zielona
 Jan "Scibor" Taczanowski (c. 1437)
 Stanisław Radziejowski (1627–1637)
 Maksymilian Przerębski (1637-I 1639)
 Stefan Gembicki (I 1639–1653)

Regional council seat (Sejmik): Łęczyca

Political division
 County of Łęczyca, area 2,447 km2.,
 County of Brzeziny, area 1,300 km2.,
 County of Orłów, area 629 km2.

Neighbouring Voivodeships:
 Sieradz Voivodeship
 Kalisz Voivodeship
 Brześć Kujawski Voivodeship
 Rawa Voivodeship
 Sandomierz Voivodeship

Sources 
 Łęczyca Voivodeship, description by Zygmunt Gloger

Voivodeships of the Polish–Lithuanian Commonwealth
14th-century establishments in Poland
1793 disestablishments in the Polish–Lithuanian Commonwealth